The Pebbles and Bamm-Bamm Show is an American animated television series produced by Hanna-Barbera Productions that originally aired for one season on CBS Saturday morning from September 11, 1971, to January 1, 1972. With an ensemble voice cast of Sally Struthers, Jay North, Mitzi McCall, Gay Hartwig, Carl Esser and Lennie Weinrib, the show follows teenage Pebbles Flintstone and Bamm-Bamm Rubble as they encounter problems growing up in the fictional town of Bedrock. The Pebbles and Bamm-Bamm Show is the first spin-off series of The Flintstones. For the 1972-73 season, the show was revamped as The Flintstone Comedy Hour, with more time given to the original Flintstones cast alongside both reruns and newly produced segments of Pebbles and Bamm-Bamm.

Similar to Hanna-Barbera's Josie and the Pussycats, it used contemporary rock music to attract more viewers. The 16 episodes have since had reruns broadcast on Boomerang often surrounded by interstitial cartoons and shorts. Critical responses were mixed. It has since been released on DVD as part of Warner Home Video's "Hanna-Barbera Classic Collection" on a two disc set.

Overview
Set in the Stone Age, the series follows Pebbles and Bamm-Bamm as they face problems with growing up in the town of Bedrock. No longer toddlers, the two were now teenagers and began dating each other. The show focuses on them attending Bedrock High School and also getting their first jobs. Together, Pebbles and Bamm-Bamm formed a musical band called the Bedrock Rockers, which was considered an attempt to be the "Stone Age" version of the Archies by one critic. Unlike The Flintstones, it centered on the children of the family, rather than parents Fred and Wilma Flintstone, and Barney and Betty Rubble. These characters would continue to appear in the series, albeit in reduced roles.

Cast and characters
The series features the following seven main characters throughout its run:
 Sally Struthers as Pebbles Flintstone, Fred and Wilma's daughter, Bamm-Bamm's best friend/girlfriend and a beautiful, social teenager. Enthusiastic, well-meaning and kind-hearted, she often tries to help someone in trouble, but usually ends up getting herself and her friends into even bigger trouble. Like her father, her catchphrase was "Yabba-dabba-doozy!", which was appropriate as most of her schemes were indeed doozies. Much like The Flintstones, Pebbles' "trademark" ponytail was held in place with a bone in the show. When Struthers left the series in order to fulfill a role on the American sitcom All in the Family, actress Mikki Stevens took her place for "The Pebbles and Bamm-Bamm Show" segments on The Flintstone Comedy Hour.
 Jay North as Bamm-Bamm Rubble, Barney and Betty's muscular, adopted son and Pebbles' best friend/boyfriend. This marked North's second role as a voice actor for Hanna-Barbera (outside of Arabian Knights; he also voice acted in DePatie-Freleng's Here Comes the Grump), having previously acted on series like Dennis the Menace, Wanted Dead or Alive and My Three Sons.
 Mitzi McCall as Penny, the small intelligent friend of Pebbles who often worried about her weight.
 Gay Hartwig as both Wiggy and Cindy. Wiggy was an astrology enthusiast who spoke in an operatic voice and Cindy was a spoiled primary antagonist with an interest in Bamm-Bamm and nemesis of Pebbles.
 Carl Esser as Fabian, the other spoiled antagonist of the series and a nemesis of Pebbles and Bamm-Bamm.
 Lennie Weinrib as Moonrock, one of Pebbles and Bamm-Bamm's friends who was intelligent and enjoyed inventing things, though they don't always work as intended. Weinrib was a frequent voice actor for Hanna-Barbera, previously fulfilling roles on The Jetsons, Scooby-Doo, Where Are You!, and Help!... It's the Hair Bear Bunch!.

Production and continuation
The Pebbles and Bamm-Bamm Show was the first spin-off TV series derived from The Flintstones, following the theatrical film The Man Called Flintstone in 1966. Joe Ruby and Ken Spears, creators of Scooby-Doo, Where are You!, served as story editors on Pebbles and Bamm-Bamm, and several individuals wrote episodes for the series, including Joel Kane, Woody Kling, and Howard Morganstern. Executive produced by William Hanna and Joseph Barbera, Charles A. Nichols served as the director and Iwao Takamoto was the creative producer and key character designer. The main title theme and musical directors for The Pebbles and Bamm-Bamm Show were made by Hoyt Curtin and Ted Nichols. Elliot Lawrence wrote songs for the series, with music arrangements by Lanny Meyers. The songs were recorded by Regent Sound Studios.

Author Christopher P. Lehman wrote that the success of The Pebbles and Bamm-Bamm Show inspired Hanna-Barbera to create The Flintstone Comedy Hour in 1972. It combined previously broadcast episodes alongside new cartoons and shorts. Serving as a continuation, the new series featured newly-produced eleven-minute vignette versions of The Pebbles & Bamm-Bamm Show, as well as reruns from the 1971-72 season, during each of its eighteen episodes. The Flintstone Comedy Hour also included musical interludes performed by The Bedrock Rockers, similar to the original series. Fred Flintstone and Friends (1977), a later anthology series compiled for syndication, included reruns of segments from both The Pebbles and Bamm-Bamm Show and The Flintstone Comedy Hour.

The Pebbles and Bamm-Bamm Show was one of the first shows to use Hanna-Barbera's limited laugh track, as they stopped using a full laugh track provided by Charley Douglass by the fall of 1971.

Episodes

Reception

Broadcast history
The Pebbles and Bamm-Bamm Show was broadcast on CBS as part of their Saturday morning children's lineup between September 11, 1971 and January 1, 1972. Reruns of the series would later air again during 1975 and 1976.

The reruns of The Pebbles and Bamm-Bamm Show were incorporated into the 1972 hour-long show The Flintstone Comedy Hour as the second half-hour of the show. When the Comedy Hour first started airing, a few new Pebbles and Bamm-Bamm half-hour cartoons were produced for this position. After a few weeks, the new episodes stopped and the reruns of the original series began. Those new episodes were included in The Pebbles and Bamm-Bamm Show DVD as bonus episodes. The noticeable difference is Mickey Stevens as Pebbles' voice in the new episodes, concurrent with Stevens' voice appearing as Pebbles anytime Pebbles is seen in the shorter cartoons that comprised the first half of The Flintstone Comedy Hour.

Boomerang has broadcast The Pebbles and Bamm-Bamm Show on several occasions since its initial launch in 2000. Reruns on the network would occasionally air alongside interstitial cartoons, such as Barney Bear's The Unwelcome Guest or Tex Avery's Hound Hunters for example. As part of the Warner Bros. Family Entertainment and Warner Bros. Television Distribution's "Hanna-Barbera Classic Collection", the complete series was made available on DVD as a two-disc set.

Critical reception
Author Derek Tait wrote in his book 1970s Childhood: From Bell-Bottoms to Disco Dancing that the cartoon was one of the popular Hanna-Barbera productions of the 1970s. In a retrospective view of older cartoons, the staff at MeTV included the show on their list of "15 Forgotten Cartoons from the Early 1970s You Used to Love". Regarding the musical aspects, Tom and Sara Pendergast felt that both The Pebbles and Bamm-Bamm Show and Josie and the Pussycats incorporated contemporary rock music to attract a larger audience. On The Christian Science Monitors list of "the five dumbest moments" of The Flintstones, writer Chris Gaylord listed the series at number two. He called it "the most curious" of the various spin-offs and wrote, "Mercifully, these misadventures at Bedrock High School only lasted one season".

References

Citations

Bibliography

External links

 

The Flintstones spin-offs
1970s American animated television series
1970s American high school television series
1971 American television series debuts
1972 American television series endings
American children's animated comedy television series
American animated television spin-offs
Animated musical groups
Animated television series about siblings
CBS original programming
Crossover animated television series
English-language television shows
Older versions of cartoon characters
Television series by Hanna-Barbera
Television series by Warner Bros. Television Studios
Television series set in prehistory 
Teen animated television series